The 2015–16 Ligue 1 is the 51st season of top-tier football in Senegal and the eighth professional season. The season began on 8 November 2015. Gorée, an island based club though plays at Dakar's stadium clinched their fourth league title and first since 1984 in the league's final week with a 3-0 road win over last-place Olympique Ngor. In the cup competition, NGB ASC Niarry Tally, winner of the 2015 Senegalese Cup will participate for the first time in the 2017 CAF Confederation Cup the following season.  Gorée participated in Ligue 2 and finished second in the previous season, one of the few clubs who was in the top of second-tier competition last season to win a title of a first tier competition in West Africa.

The league comprised 14 teams, with the bottom two, ASC Suneor and Olympique Ngor, relegated to the 2017 Ligue 2.  Only four clubs were outside the Dakar area and all are in the western half of the country.  A total of 182 matches were played and fewer goals which numbered 333, fifteen lower than lase season.  US Gorée had a grand total of 42 points, one less than last season by the previous champion Douanes, ASC Linguère scored the most goals numbering 32.  Casa Sports , sixth placed and Ouakam, eight placed were the same position as last season.

During the earlier and the middle part of the season, some of the clubs reached first place and weeks later in the lower parts and the relegation zone, then a few climbed up again.

Teams
A total of 14 teams will contest the league, including 12 sides from the 2014–15 season and two promoted from the 2014–15 Ligue 2, ASEC Ndiambour and Gorée.
On the other hand, Pikine and Port de Dakar were the last two teams of the 2014–15 season and played in Ligue 2 for the 2015-16 season. AS Douanes are the defending champions from the 2014–15 season.

Stadiums and locations

League table

Positions by round

See also
2015–16 in Senegalese football

References

External links
 2015-16 Senegalese Ligue 1 season at RSSSF
 Standings at FIFA site

Senegal Premier League seasons
Senegal
1